Pambdelurion is an extinct genus of panarthropod from the Cambrian aged Sirius Passet site in northern Greenland. Like the morphologically similar Kerygmachela from the same locality, Pambdelurion is thought to be closely related to arthropods, combining characteristics of "lobopodians" with those of primitive arthropods.

Description

Omnidens, an organism from China that closely resembles Pambdelurion and may even be synonymous with it, reached even larger sizes, estimated to be  based on the proportions of Pambdelurion.

The head of Pambdelurion bore a large pair of frontal appendages, homologous to the antennae of onychophorans and frontal appendages of radiodonts. These frontal appendages were weakly muscled and relatively soft, suggesting they may have served primarily as sensory organs, rather than for grasping prey. Between the appendages are a pair of clusters of three spines, which probably served a sensory function. Eyes have not been identified. On the ventral surface of the head was the mouth, which was an oral cone similar to that of other non-arthropod ecdysozoans.

The body possessed eleven pairs of non-muscular, gill-bearing lateral flaps and eleven pairs of lobopodous legs ventral to the flaps. The body musculature was more similar to that of onychophorans than that of arthropods. The cuticle was unsclerotized.

The anterior portion of the gut was a large, muscular pharynx, as in many other ecdysozoans. More posteriorly, the gut contained paired glands.

History of study

Pambdelurion whittingtoni was named in 1997 by Graham E. Budd. The genus name comes from Greek pambdelyrion "all-loathsome" in reference to the fearsome appearance of the animal, and the specific name honors the paleontologist Harry B. Whittington.

The holotype is MGUH 24508.

Classification

Pambdelurion is regarded as a member of Lobopodia, a paraphyletic group of panarthropods that includes the ancestors of modern tardigrades, onychophorans, and arthropods. It is more closely related to arthropods than to any other modern group, but it diverged from the arthropod lineage before the last common ancestor of all modern arthropods; as such, is a stem-group arthropod. Pambdelurion is part of a group of stem-arthropods known as the gilled lobopodians, which consists of lobopodians with gill-bearing lateral flaps and also includes Kerygmachela and Opabinia. The gilled lobopodians are the closest relatives of the arthropods among lobopodians, and both the radiodonts and true arthropods are descended from a gilled lobopodian ancestor.

Omnidens, from the near-contemporaneous Maotianshan Shales of China, cannot be clearly distinguished from Pambdelurion, and it is possible that they are synonymous. However, there is no evidence of gilled lobopodians like Pambdelurion in the Maotianshan Shales, so Omnidens may be the mouthparts of some other lobopodian, such as Megadictyon or Jianshanopodia.

Paleobiology

Pambdelurion was probably a predator, with a diet including arthropods.

Pambdelurion was probably a benthic animal that lacked the ability to swim effectively.

Paleoecology

Pambdelurion was one of the largest and most abundant organisms in the Sirius Passet biota.

References

Works cited

External links

Anomalocarid Homepage 
Palaeos 

Dinocarida
Prehistoric arthropod genera
Cambrian arthropods
Sirius Passet fossils